is a Japanese musician and virtual YouTuber who is signed to Imperial Records. She began her artist activities as a doujin artist, uploading songs on the video-sharing website Nicovideo, before making her major debut in 2015 with the release of her single "Stella-rium". Her songs have been featured in anime series such as Wish Upon the Pleiades, Heavy Object, Azur Lane, and Uzaki-chan Wants to Hang Out!.

Career
Kano's music activities began in 2010 when she began uploading songs on the Japanese video-sharing website Nicovideo. In 2015, she made her debut as a major artist with the release of her single "Stella-rium" on May 20; the title song is used as the opening theme of the anime series Wish Upon the Pleiades. Her second single, was released on November 18, 2015; the title song was used as the first ending theme of the anime series Heavy Object.

Kano released her first major album, Nowhere, on May 11, 2016. Her third single, "Nameless", was released on September 7, 2016, with the title track being used as the ending theme of the anime series Alderamin on the Sky. Her fourth single "Day by Day" was released on May 24, 2017; the title song is used as the ending theme of the anime series Sword Oratoria. Her second album, was released on December 20, 2017.

In 2018, it was announced that she would provide the voice bank for the Japanese version of the Chinese Vocaloid Luo Tianyi. On December 19, 2018, she released her third album, Rye.

On September 25, 2019, Kano released the mini-album . This was followed by the release of the single  on November 27, 2019; the title track was used as the ending theme of the anime series Azur Lane.

In 2020, Kano announced that she would debut as a Virtual YouTuber, with her 3D image being based on an avatar called "Bambi" that she has used on various media such as official artwork. This was followed by the release of her fourth album, Yuanfen, on March 4, 2020. She released the single  on September 2, 2020; a duet version with voice actress Naomi Ōzora is used as the opening theme of the anime series Uzaki-chan Wants to Hang Out!.

Discography

Singles

Albums

Mini-albums

References

External links
 Official website 
 

Anime musicians
Japanese women singers
Living people
VTubers
Year of birth missing (living people)
Virtual influencers
Utaite